Manda Ophuis (born 27 November 1980) is a Dutch former singer who is best known for being the lead vocalist in the symphonic rock band Nemesea. She has been involved in music since a young age.

Biography 
In 1998, Ophuis started taking singing lessons. Her teacher was a student at the conservatory in Groningen, where she herself was admitted a year later. There she began taking vocal lessons with Floor van Zutphen who remained her vocal teacher during her time at the conservatory (2000–2004).

In 2003, Ophuis started taking classical singing lessons as well, also with a student from the conservatory. She took those lessons for two years. She graduated in 2004. In 2005, Ophuis found a new vocal teacher in Kees Taal. Taal taught her about breathing, resonance and how to use the whole body as an instrument.

In 2011, Ophuis decided that she wanted to broaden her range and started taking singing lessons with Setske Mostaert as well.

In August 2016, Ophuis quit the band after 14 years. She has continued in music, working with children.

Influences 
Ophuis's main inspirations are Anneke van Giersbergen, Tori Amos, Christina Aguilera, and Kelly Clarkson.

References

External links

1980 births
Living people
Dutch rock singers
21st-century Dutch singers